Advance Newspapers, based in Hudsonville, Michigan, published weekly community newspapers for Kent County, Michigan and portions of Muskegon, Ottawa, and Allegan counties. Advance Newspapers started as an independent company, later purchased by Advance Publications which later placed them into their MLive Media Group unit. MLive Media Group ceased publication of the seven community newspapers as of January 27, 2019, citing the "cost of publishing the products exceeded the company’s ability to sustain production."

The seven Advance community newspapers at the time of their shuttering were:
 Southwest Advance – covering Byron Center and Wyoming
 Grand Valley Advance – covering Allendale, Hudsonville, Allendale and Jenison
 Cadence Advance – covering East Grand Rapids, Ada and the Forest Hills area
 Northeast Advance – covering Rockford and Cedar Springs
 Northwest Advance – covering Walker, Comstock Park, Coopersville, Sparta and vicinity
 Penasee Globe – covering Wayland, Hopkins, Dorr, Martin and the Gun Lake area
 Southeast Advance – covering Kentwood, Caledonia and Cutlerville

References

Newspaper companies of the United States
Companies based in Michigan
Ottawa County, Michigan
 Newspapers